Immortal is the fourth studio album by Christian metalcore band For Today, released on May 29, 2012 through Razor & Tie Records.

The album debuted at No. 15 on the Billboard 200, with 14,700 copies sold in the first week, as well as No. 1 on both the Hard Rock Albums and the Top Christian Albums charts.  It makes this the best sales and chart performance for the band.

Track listing

Personnel 
For Today
Mattie Montgomery – lead vocals
Ryan Leitru – lead guitar, vocals
Mike Reynolds- rhythm guitar
Brandon Leitru – bass guitar
David Morrison – drums, percussion

Additional musicians
Tom Green (Sleeping Giant, xDEATHSTARx) – guest vocals on track 8
Jake Luhrs (August Burns Red) – guest vocals on track 9
Sonny Sandoval (P.O.D.) – guest vocals on track 10

Production
Will Putney – producer, mixing, mastering
Phill Mamula – cover art

References 

2012 albums
For Today albums
Razor & Tie albums
Albums produced by Will Putney